Nevada State Hospital was a public psychiatric hospital in Nevada, Missouri, constructed in 1887. The hospital was built in the design of the Kirkbride Plan.

History
Provisions for the hospital were approved by the state of Missouri in 1885, and the hospital was constructed in 1887. The hospital officially closed in 1991, and was demolished in 1999.

Notable patients

 David W. Stark, member of the Missouri State Legislature

References

Works cited

 

1887 in Missouri
Defunct hospitals in Missouri
Kirkbride Plan hospitals
Buildings and structures demolished in 1999
Demolished buildings and structures in Missouri